The West London Institute of Higher Education (WLIHE), a two-campus academic establishment, was located in Isleworth and East Twickenham, West London, UK from 1976 until 1995 when it became Brunel University College. In 1997 it was fully integrated into Brunel University.

Establishment 

West London Institute was created in 1976 from the merger of Borough Road and Maria Grey teacher training colleges and Chiswick Polytechnic. Borough Road College, on the Osterley campus, dated back to 1889 in that location and to 1798 in its previous home on Borough Road in Southwark. As a College of Higher Education from 1976, West London received funding from the local government, and it had to perform adequately in the higher education sector. It was placed under the direction, as Principal, of a sport psychologist and former physical education lecturer, Professor John Kane OBE, and a geographer Murie Robertson, who served as Vice-Principal. It awarded undergraduate degrees (CNAA) and HNDs, and continued to train teachers, being, for example, a specialist 'Wing College' for Physical Education. Operating over two campuses, one on St. Margarets Road in East Twickenham, alongside the River Thames, and the other immediately south of the Great West Road in Osterley. The Borough Road name persisted on the rugby field and the Institute's sports strip.

The 1980s 
By the 1980s, the degree and diploma programmes at WLIHE were being delivered through various disciplines.  The Borough Road College campus in Osterley was home to American Studies, English Literature, History, Religious Studies, Geography, Geology, Business Studies, Physiotherapy, Occupational Therapy, Social Work, and Sports Studies, while the Arts, Music, and Education were clustered two miles away at the old Maria Grey College site in East Twickenham. For several years, the Colleges were affiliated with The University of London's Institute of Education and offered University of London degree courses. By the 1990s, the courses offered mainly were joint honours awards in various combinations including: American Studies, Drama, Art, French, Business Studies, English Literature, Geography, Geology, History, Religious Studies, Music and Sports Studies, plus single-honours degrees in Physiotherapy, Occupational Therapy, and Social Work.   By the 1990s, a few Masters programmes were also offered; for example, in Sport Sciences (the first in Greater London), Social Work, and Environmental Change.  A small number of PhDs were also awarded across the disciplines. The British and Foreign School Society  kept an archive and ran a National Religious Education Centre on the Osterley site. The Twickenham site also hosted a ballet school, the Rambert. For its size and status (Higher Education colleges in the UK were not expected to be high research performers), the Institute performed relatively well in research, with several departments achieving national recognition in the Research Assessment Exercises of the 1980s and 1990s (1992 result here) – WLIHE also did well in the 1996 assessment – and a few staff held national research awards from the ESRC and other bodies.

The merger with Brunel University 

A merger approach by the Vice-Chancellor of Brunel University, Professor Michael Sterling, went amicably – WLIHE had expertise and subject areas that Brunel did not.  In 1995 WLIHE ceased to exist. For the next two years, its campuses and departments were known as Brunel University College, under the stewardship of a Provost, Prof. Eric Billett, and then simply as Brunel University from 1997. This status prevailed for about six years before Brunel decided to centralise all its operations on its Uxbridge campus, 8 miles away. By this time, many departments had already moved from Osterley to Uxbridge. The East Twickenham campus, which contained several older buildings and had a riverfront location, was sold off in 2005 and was largely demolished and converted into luxury housing. Its central building, Gordon House, was on the market for two years at £15,000,000 after being sold once. It has been renamed Richmond House, even though it is not in Richmond.

Alumni 

 Denys Baptiste Jazz musician (tenor saxophone) and composer
 Steve Bates England Rugby international scrum-half (1989)
 Nigel Bevan GB Olympic Games (1982) Javelin
 Kevin Bowring Wales National Rugby Union coach (1995–98); RFU Director of Professional Coach Development (2002–16) 
 Judith Burne GB Rowing, Coxless Four, World Championships (1985 & 1986) & Commonwealth Games Gold medal (1986)
 Dave Collins Professor in Human Performance Science, Edinburgh University; GB Athletics Performance Director, Olympics 2008; Sport Psychologist for British Weightlifting, Short Track Speed Skating, Skeleton, Judo, Curling and Athletics, plus New Zealand Ski and Snowboard, in attendance at 14 Olympic Games and numerous World/Commonwealth/European Championships/Games;played American Football for GB. 
 Garry Cook GB Olympic Games Silver medalist, 4 × 400 m (1984), and World Championships 800m (1983)
 Greg Davies stand-up comedian and actor 
 Abi Ekoku CEO and Rugby League player, Bradford Bulls; Discus thrower, UK Champion, GB/England – European Championships/Commonwealth Games
 Justin Fitzpatrick Ireland Rugby international prop forward (1998-03)
 Brett Garrard GB & England Hockey international, Olympian (2000 & 2004); GB and England's most capped player
 Julian Golley GB Olympic Games (1992) & England Commonwealth Games Gold medalist (1994) Triple Jump
 Audley Harrison MBE GB Olympic Games (2000), Gold medal, Boxing (Super-heavyweight division)
 Mark Hatton GB Winter Olympian (2002 & 2006) Luge
 Dave Heaven Jazz guitarist
 Toby Hessian GB Rowing LtWt Coxless Fours, World Championships Gold Medal (1991)
 Richard Hill MBE British & Irish Lions (1997)/England Rugby international (1997-09); World Cup winner with England 2003; currently the England National Rugby Union Team Manager
 Patricia Hodge OBE, actor; Olivier Award 2000
 Julie Hollman GB Olympic Games, Heptathlon (2008), World Championships (2003) and England Commonwealth Games (2002 & 2006)
 Paul Honeyford a successful author and linguist
 Eddie van Hoof GB Gymnastics, Olympic Games (1984) & UK Coach of the Year 2016
 Ben Johnston England Rugby international centre three-quarter (2002)
 Alex King England Rugby international fly-half (1997-03)
 John Mallet England Rugby international prop forward (1995)
 Mark Naylor GB High Jump, Olympics (1980 & 1984)
 John Olver England Rugby international hooker (1990–92)
 David Ottley GB Javelin, Olympics Silver medal (1984), Commonwealth Games Gold medal (1986) & World Championships (1987)
 Mark Pearn GB & England Hockey international; Olympian (2000 & 2004)
 Bernard Pitt, British teacher, poet and army officer
 Courtney Rumbolt GB Four-man Bobsleigh, Bronze medalist, Winter Olympics (1994)
 Kathy Smallwood-Cook MBE 13 medals at the Olympics, World Championships, European Championships, and Commonwealth Games in Athletics (sprints; 1978–84)
 Kelly Sotherton MBE; Bronze medalist in Heptathlon at Olympic Games and Gold at the Commonwealth Games
 Paul Stimpson GB & England Basketball, played over 120 times for GB and England and captained England
 Linda Strachan GB Fencing (Foil), Olympic Games 1988 & 1992
 Ian Taylor GB Hockey goalkeeper and Olympic Gold medalist (1988)
 Iwan Thomas MBE Silver medalist for 400 m at the Commonwealth Games (2002); European 400 m champion (1998), Gold medalist in the 4 × 400 m relay at the European Championships (1998); Silver medallist in the 4 × 400 m relay at the Olympics (1996) and a member of the winning 4 × 400 m relay team at the World Championships (1997); current TV presenter
 Darren Treasure Sport Psychologist & High Performance Director for the Nike Oregon Project; Associate Professor Arizona State University & Honorary Professor Bath University.
 Ian Tullett GB & England Pole Vault; Silver medalist, Commonwealth Games (1990)
 Jeremy West GB Canoeing, Olympic Games & two Gold medals at the World Championships (1986)
 Anthony Whiteman GB Olympian (1996 & 2000); winner of the 1500 m, World University Games 1997; Master's world record holder for 800 m
 Alan Whitwell GB Rowing, three Olympic Games, Silver medal Men's Eight (1980), & World Championships, Lightweight Double Sculls Gold medallist (1986)
 Jason Wing GB Four-man Bobsleigh, Winter Olympics (1994), & European Championships Silver medalist (1994) 
 Greg Whyte (sportsman) OBE GB Modern Pentathlon Olympian (1992 & 1996), won World Championship silver & European bronze (1991); Professor of Applied Sport & Exercise Science, Liverpool John Moores University

Former notable staff include:
 Prof. Gavin D'Costa theologian, University of Bristol
 Danny Kerry MBE GB Women's Hockey Head Coach, led the team to Olympic Gold medal (2016)
 Em. Prof. Théodore Macdonald, polymath health promotion professor, medical doctor, mathematician and human rights activist; (1933-2011)
 Em. Prof. Bill McGuire University College London, geologist, TV presenter and author
 Alan Pascoe MBE European & Commonwealth Gold Medallist, and Olympic Games finalist, 400m Hurdles; Olympic Silver medalist, 4 × 400 m relay; Vice-Chair of the London 2012 Olympic bid
  Prof. Iain Stewart, University of Plymouth, earth sciences television presenter and geologist 
 Prof. Peter C. Terry (sport psychologist), Dean of the Graduate Research School, University of Southern Queensland; Sport Psychologist in attendance at the  World Bobsleigh Championships 1990, 1991, 1993, 1996 & 1997, Olympic Winter Games (Bobsleigh) 1992, 1994 & 1998, Olympic Summer Games (Tennis) 1992 & Shooting 2000, 2004, 2008 & 2012, World Shooting Championships 2002, 2003, 2005, 2007, 2010, & 2011, etc.; GB Team Manager, World Shooting Championships 2001 & 2006. NB Also a former student.

References 

Educational institutions established in 1976
Defunct universities and colleges in London
1976 establishments in England
Defunct universities and colleges in England